Stelios Marangos (born 4 May 1989) is a Greek professional footballer who plays as a centre back for Gamma Ethniki club Kozani.

Career
On 4 July 2013, Marangos signed a contract with AEK Larnaca in Cyprus for 1+1 years.

In early January Marangos agreed on a free transfer to Veria which would be activated on 1 July 2015. An action that bothered Kerkyra's manager and the administration board and led him to the exit. On 27 January 2015, Veria announced the signing of Marangos on a free transfer.

On 4 January 2017, Marangos signed a one-and-a-half year contract with Platanias.

On 13 July 2017 he signed with Greek major club Aris Thessaloniki.

Honours
Veria
Gamma Ethniki: 2018–19
Imathia Cup: 2018–19

References

External links
 

1989 births
Living people
Greek footballers
Doxa Drama F.C. players
Platanias F.C. players
Kavala F.C. players
AEK Larnaca FC players
PAE Kerkyra players
Veria F.C. players
Veria NFC players
Kozani F.C. players
Super League Greece players
Football League (Greece) players
Cypriot First Division players
Greek expatriate footballers
Expatriate footballers in Cyprus
Association football central defenders
Footballers from Veria